Tropidonophis mcdowelli, the Northern New Guinea keelback, is a species of colubrid snake. It is found in Indonesia and Papua New Guinea.

References

Tropidonophis
Reptiles of Papua New Guinea
Reptiles of Indonesia
Reptiles described in 1988